Lieshimu  is a station on Line 1 of Chongqing Rail Transit in Chongqing Municipality, China. It is located in Shapingba District. It opened in 2012.

Station structure

References

Railway stations in China opened in 2012
Chongqing Rail Transit stations
Shapingba District